George Leslie, 4th Earl of Rothes (2 Aug 1484 – 24 November 1558) was a Scottish nobleman and diplomat.

George was the eldest son and heir of William Leslie, 3rd Earl of Rothes and Lord Leslie, who fell at the Battle of Flodden in 1513. George succeeded his father William, who in turn had succeeded his brother, George Leslie, the 2nd Earl. On 1 April 1517 George and his first wife redeemed by purchase family lands which James IV of Scotland had sold to Andrew Barton.

He was Sheriff of Fife from 1529 to 1540 and a Lord of Session from 1541 and a Lord of the Articles from 1544.

George accompanied James V of Scotland on his wedding trip to France in 1536. He was tried for the murder of Cardinal Beaton and acquitted in 1546. He was ambassador to Denmark in 1550, and died at Dieppe, France in 1558.

George died while returning from the solemnization of the marriage of Mary, Queen of Scots, which he witnessed. Several of the other Scottish commissioners died, Lord Fleming at Paris, and the Bishop of Orkney and Earl of Cassillis at Dieppe on the same night as George, 24 November 1558. It was rumoured that they were murdered because of their stance on the issue of giving the Crown-Matrimonial of Scotland to the Dauphin.

Family
He married firstly, Margaret Crichton, illegitimate daughter of William, 3rd Lord Crichton and Princess Margaret Stewart. Their eldest son was Norman Leslie who was involved in the murder of Cardinal Beaton and the siege of St Andrews Castle. Norman pre-deceased his father, so the next Earl was Andrew Leslie, a son of George's third marriage to Agnes, daughter of John Somerville of Cambusnethan, Lanarkshire.

George divorced Margaret Crichton on 27 November 1520, and married, on 5 June 1525, Elizabeth, daughter of Andrew, 3rd Lord Gray. She was the widow of John Lyon, 4th Lord Glamis. They had no children, and she died before 1530. George married thirdly, Agnes, a daughter of John Somerville of Cambusnethan, the widow of John, 2nd Lord Fleming, with issue. After Agnes's death, in 1542, George was reunited with Margaret Crichton and they had further issue. He then married Isobel Lundy, widow of the 7th Earl of Crawford, with no issue.

Children of George and Margaret include;
 Norman Leslie, Master of Rothes
 William Leslie of Cairnie, forfeited for his part in Cardinal Beaton's murder
 Elizabeth (or Isabel) Leslie, married David Leslie of Inverdovate, Fife. 
 Robert Leslie of Ardersier, (born after 1542)
 Agnes Leslie, (born after 1542), married William Douglas of Lochleven, later Earl of Morton
 Euphemia Leslie, married George Learmonth of Balcomie
 Margaret Leslie, married 25 Dec 1575 Archibald Douglas, 8th Earl of Angus, (divorced 1587).
Children of George and Agnes Somerville;
 Andrew, the heir.
 James Leslie
 Margaret Leslie, who married John Cunningham of Glengarnock.
 Helen Leslie, who married (1) Gilbert Seton of Parbroath, (2) Mark Kerr, Commendator of Newbattle.
 Beatrix Leslie, who married David Beaton of Creich.

References

Sources
 The Complete Peerage by G. E. Cockayne, edited by Geoffrey H. White, FSA., FRHist.S., vol.xi, London, 1949, pp. 190–193 & notes.
 Burke's Peerage Baronetage & Knightage edited by Peter Townend, 105th edition, London, 1970, pp. 1653 and 2305.

1558 deaths
4
Scottish diplomats
Court of James V of Scotland
Year of birth unknown
Scottish murder victims
1484 births